

Qualification system
A total of 80 tennis players will qualify to compete at the Games (48 men and 32 women). Each country is allowed to enter a maximum of three male and three female athletes (with one pair maximum in each of the doubles events). The singles events will consist of 48 men and 32 women respectively, with those athletes competing in the doubles events. The host nation Canada was allowed to enter with a maximum team of 6 athletes, while the remaining spots were distributed using the ATP rankings and WTA rankings. A further four wildcards for men and one for women was also awarded.

Qualification summary
The quota allocation was released on June 5, 2015.

Qualification summary

Men's singles

Men's doubles

Women's singles

Women's doubles

Mixed doubles

References

Qualification for the 2015 Pan American Games
Qualification
Qualification for tennis tournaments